Cologna is a village in the Val Poschiavo in the canton of Graubünden, Switzerland.

References

Poschiavo